Vincennes is a station on RER A the commune of Vincennes, Val-de-Marne.

Service
Vincennes is served by both eastern branches of the RER A line, the A2 towards Boissy-Saint-Léger, and the A4 towards Marne-la-Vallée–Chessy. It is the only station on the RER A in zone 2 and the last before the line splits into the A2 and A4.

Bus connections 
The station is served by several buses:

References

V
V
V